Mississippi is the poorest state in the United States of America, with a per capita income of $20,670 (2012).

Mississippi counties ranked by per capita income 

Note: Data is from the 2010 United States Census Data and the 2006-2010 American Community Survey 5-Year Estimates.

References

Economy of Mississippi
Mississippi
Income